Robert Nicolas-Charles Bochsa (9 August 1789 – 6 January 1856) was a harpist and composer. His relationship with Anna Bishop was popularly thought to have inspired that of Svengali and Trilby in George du Maurier's 1894 novel Trilby.

Life

The son of a Bohemian-born musician, Karl Bochsa (de), Bochsa was born in Montmédy, Meuse, France. He was able to play the flute and piano by the age of seven. In 1807, he went to study at the Paris Conservatoire. He was appointed harpist to the Imperial Orchestra in 1813, and began writing operas for the Opéra-Comique. However, in 1817 he became entangled in counterfeiting, fraud, and forgery, and fled to London to avoid prosecution. He was convicted in absentia, and sentenced to twelve years hard labour and a fine of 4,000 francs.

Safe from French law in London, he helped found the Royal Academy of Music in 1821, and became its secretary. He taught there, amongst others, the British harp virtuoso Elias Parish Alvars. When his criminal conviction was revealed in 1826, he was forced to resign. He then became Musical Director of the Kings Theatre in London.

In 1839, he became involved in another scandal when he ran off with the opera singer Anna Bishop, wife of the composer Henry Bishop. They performed together in North America and throughout Europe (except France). In Naples Bochsa was appointed Director of the Regio Teatro San Carlo, (the Royal Opera House) and stayed there for two years.

Bochsa arrived with Anna Bishop in Sydney, Australia, at the time of the gold rush in December 1855, but they gave only one concert together before Bochsa died. Bishop was heartbroken, and commissioned an elaborate tomb for him in Camperdown Cemetery.

Operas
Le Retour de Trajan, ou, Rome triomphante
Les Héritiers Michau, ou Le Moulin de Lieursain
L'Héritier de Paimpol
Le Roi et la ligue
Les Noces de Gamache
La Lettre de change (English: The Promissory Note; German: Der Wechselbrief)
Un Mari pour étrennes

Bibliography
 Michel Faul, Nicolas-Charles Bochsa, harpiste, compositeur, escroc (Éditions Delatour, 2003)
 Michel Faul, Les Tribulations mexicaines de Nicolas-Charles Bochsa, harpiste (Éditions Delatour, 2006)

References

External links
A site (in French) introducing the two books about Bochsa above
Further documents
Bochsa's tomb in Camperdown cemetery
Harp scores by Nicolas-Charles Bochsa from the International Harp Archives on archive.org

1789 births
1856 deaths
19th-century classical composers
19th-century French composers
19th-century French male musicians
Academics of the Royal Academy of Music
Composers for harp
French ballet composers
French classical harpists
French fraudsters
French male classical composers
French opera composers
French people of Czech descent
French Romantic composers
Male opera composers
People from Meuse (department)